Nemesia floribunda is an erect annual herb that is native to South Africa, but has naturalized elsewhere.

Description 

Taxonomy 
Nemesia floribunda was described by the German botanist Johann Georg Christian Lehmann, but was originally discovered and collected by Christian Friedrich Ecklon.

Distribution 
Nemesia floribunda is native to South Africa, but has naturalized in New Zealand.

References

External links 

 
 

 
Flora of South Africa
Flora of New Zealand
Plants described in 1836